Thumrait is a small town and wilayat (province) of the Dhofar Governorate in southern Oman. In ancient times Thumrait was an important point on the Arabian peninsula's caravan routes. Frankincense trees, an important crop, used to grow in greater abundance in Thumrait than now. The main occupation of the people of Thumrait is the cultivation of fruit, vegetables and animal fodder.

Military 

Thumrait is notable for its Royal Air Force of Oman station.  Originally an oil depot, RAFO Thumrait was created to establish air power in that region of Oman.  The first Omani air unit based at Thumrait, equipped with Hawker Hunter FG.9 aircraft, was tasked with ground attack and intercept missions. 12 new SEPECAT Jaguar fighter-bombers were added to the base's complement to improve attack capabilities in 1977.

RAFO Thumrait has been used by US, UK and Allied air forces to support operations during Operations Desert Shield and Desert Storm around the time of the Gulf War, and later in Global War on Terror operations in Afghanistan.  Many current such operations now operate from Muscat International Airport, which is closer to the area of operations.

Thumrait is also the home of the Western Frontier Regiment.

Exercises held at Thumrait Air Base

In 2009, Indian Air Force pilots of ‘Flaming Arrows’ and ‘Cobras’, the two SEPECAT Jaguar Squadrons participated in joint exercises called ‘Eastern Bridge’ alongside the Royal Air Force of Oman (RAFO)'s force of SEPECAT Jaguars and General Dynamics F-16 Fighting Falcons at Thumrait Air Base.  A subsequent Indo-Omani exercise, ‘Eastern Bridge-II,’ took place in 2011 at Indian Air Force Station Jamnagar (Gujarat).

Climate

Thumrait has a hot desert climate (Köppen climate classification BWh) with very hot summers and warm winters. There is very little rainfall; some rain may occur from February to April, as well as June to August due to the monsoon.

See also 

 List of cities in Oman

References 

Populated places in Oman